Eftihios "Tio" Ellinas (born 27 January 1992 in Larnaca, Cyprus) is a Cypriot race car driver. Ellinas began racing go-karts at the age of seven, and from 2003 - 2009 won 10 kart racing championships in Cyprus, in 2005 winning the ROK Cup International Final. He was the winner of Grand Prix Shootout in the UK in 2009 competing against 50 other top young drivers from all over the world.

In 2010, he competed in the MSA Dunlop Formula Ford Championship of Great Britain racing with the JTR Team. He won three races and finished fourth in the championship, the highest placing for a novice driver since Jenson Button in 1998, earning him "Rookie Of The Year" honors.

In 2011, Ellinas raced in the UK Formula Renault 2.0 championship for the Atech Reid GP Team, finishing third overall. He joined Marussia Manor Racing for the 2012 GP3 Series season.

In 2013, he tested for the Marussia F1 Team.

Career

Karting
Ellinas' first taste of motorsport came when he was seven years old racing in karts. He competed in 131 races, winning 101 of them with 20 further podium finishes. His championship positions are as follows:

Third in Cyprus Karting Championship – KZ2 2009.
Second in ROK Cup Cyprus – Super Class 2009.
Cyprus Karting Championship – KF2 champion 2009.
Bridgestone Cup Cyprus champion in the KZ2 class 2009.
Second in Cyprus Karting Championship – KZ2 2008.
Third in ROK Cup Cyprus – Senior 2007.
Cyprus Rotax Max Challenge champion in the Junior class 2006.
Cyprus champion in the ICA Junior class 2006.
ROK Cup International Final champion in the Junior ROK class 2005.
ROK Cup Cyprus – Junior champion 2005.
Cyprus champion in the ICA Junior class 2005.
Cyprus Rotax Max Challenge champion in the Junior class 2004.
Cyprus champion in the ICA Junior class 2004.
Cyprus Rotax Max Challenge champion in the Junior class 2003.

Grand Prix Shootout
Ellinas took part in the inaugural Grand Prix Shootout competition in the United Kingdom in 2009. He was assessed by the world-famous driving coach Rob Wilson in September 2009 as part of the competition. He then completed a number of sessions in a Double R Racing Formula BMW car at the Pembrey Circuit in Wales. In January 2010, Ellinas was announced as the first Grand Prix Shootout winner at the Autosport International exhibition. He had taken on fifty other karters and drivers with over 100 major racing titles between them, and in the end was the runaway winner.

Formula Ford

Ellinas competed in the MSA Dunlop Formula Ford Championship of Great Britain with the JTR team. He was only the second driver since the legendary Ayrton Senna to start on the front row of a British Formula Ford race in his car racing debut, and was also the fastest driver at every wet test during that first year. Ellinas's fourth position overall in the 2010 MSA British Formula Ford championship earned him Rookie Of The Year honors, and is the best result for a rookie driver since the current McLaren Formula One driver and 2009 World Drivers' Champion, Jenson Button, in 1998.

Formula Renault

Ellinas competed in the Formula Renault UK championship with the Atech Reid GP team and finished third overall.

GP3 Series
Ellinas contested the 2012 GP3 Series season debut with Marussia Manor Racing. He finished the season eighth overall, recording one win and one podium finish in the season finale at Monza.

Formula One
On 17 June 2013, it was announced that Ellinas would carry out a scheduled straightline aerodynamic evaluation test session with the Marussia Formula One team at Kemble airfield in Gloucestershire, England. In doing so, he became the first Cypriot to drive a Formula One car. As a reward for being the highest-placed Marussia Manor driver at the end of the 2012 GP3 Series season, Ellinas took part in the 2013 Young Driver Tests with Marussia F1.

Racing record

Career summary

† As Ellinas was a guest driver, he was ineligible to score points.

Complete GP3 Series results
(key) (Races in bold indicate pole position; races in italics indicate fastest lap)

Complete GP2 Series results
(key)

Complete Formula Renault 3.5 Series results
(key) (Races in bold indicate pole position)

Complete Porsche Supercup results
(key) (Races in bold indicate pole position) (Races in italics indicate fastest lap)

⹋ No points awarded as less than 50% of race distance was completed.

Personal life
Ellinas continues to live in Larnaca, Cyprus.

References

External links
 
 

1992 births
Living people
People from Larnaca
Cypriot racing drivers
Formula Ford drivers
British Formula Renault 2.0 drivers
Formula Renault 2.0 NEC drivers
MRF Challenge Formula 2000 Championship drivers
GP3 Series drivers
GP2 Series drivers
World Series Formula V8 3.5 drivers
Porsche Carrera Cup GB drivers
Manor Motorsport drivers
MP Motorsport drivers
Walter Lechner Racing drivers
Rapax Team drivers
Strakka Racing drivers